John Joseph Kehoe (August 28, 1891 – April 16, 1967) was an accountant and political figure in Ontario. He represented Cochrane North in the Legislative Assembly of Ontario from 1943 to 1945 as a Co-operative Commonwealth member.

The son of Michael J. Kehoe and Caroline Fuller, he was born in King township in 1891. In 1915, Kehoe married Muriel Grier. He lived in Kapuskasing.

He died at a Toronto hospital in 1967.

References

External links

1891 births
1967 deaths
20th-century Canadian politicians
Ontario Co-operative Commonwealth Federation MPPs